John Service (4 December 1930 – 28 August 1996) was a British swimmer. He competed in the men's 200 metre breaststroke at the 1948 Summer Olympics.

References

External links
 

1930 births
1996 deaths
Scottish male swimmers
British male swimmers
Olympic swimmers of Great Britain
Swimmers at the 1948 Summer Olympics
Place of birth missing
Swimmers at the 1954 British Empire and Commonwealth Games
Commonwealth Games medallists in swimming
Commonwealth Games bronze medallists for Scotland
Male breaststroke swimmers
Medallists at the 1954 British Empire and Commonwealth Games